Narrative Inquiry in Bioethics is a triannual academic journal that was established in 2011 and published by Johns Hopkins University Press on behalf of the Foundation for Narrative Inquiry in Bioethics. The editors-in-chief are James M. DuBois (Washington University School of Medicine) and Ana S. Iltis (Wake Forest University). The journal provides a forum for exploring current issues in bioethics through the publication and analysis of personal stories, qualitative and mixed-methods research articles, and case studies.

External links
 
 Foundation for Narrative Inquiry in Bioethics

English-language journals
Publications established in 2011
Triannual journals
Bioethics journals
Johns Hopkins University Press academic journals
Qualitative research journals